Medicaid Fraud Dogg is the tenth and final studio album by American band Parliament, led by George Clinton. It was released on May 22, 2018, under the record label Clinton founded in 2003, C Kunspyruhzy Records. Guest musicians on the album include Fred Wesley and Pee Wee Ellis, one-time James Brown collaborators. It features guest appearances from Scarface and Mudbone. Medicaid Fraud Dogg was released in Japan by P-Vine records on September 12, 2018.

Background
The album followed a 38-year dry spell since the release of the band's last studio album, Trombipulation.  Most of the 23 tracks on the album were written by Clinton in collaboration with his son, Tracey Lewis.

Track listing

Sources
 
 
 
 
 
 
 

Parliament (band) albums
2018 albums